Air Power is a video game developed by Rowan Software and published by Mindscape for MS-DOS, and released on November 6, 1995.

Gameplay
Air Power is a fantasy flight simulator.

Reception

Computer Game Review summarized Air Power as "an interesting idea that comes up short in the game play department." In 1996, Computer Gaming World declared Air Power the 9th-worst computer game ever released.

Reviews
LeveL (Czech magazine) #11 (12/1995) 
PC Gamer Vol. 3 No. 3 (1996 March)

References

1995 video games
Combat flight simulators
DOS games
DOS-only games
Fantasy video games
Mindscape games
Rowan Software games
Video games developed in the United Kingdom